Scream, Baby, Scream (also known as Nightmare House) is a 1969 American horror film directed by Joseph Adler and written by Larry Cohen, who went on to write such horror classics as It's Alive and Q.

Plot
Charles Butler is a world-renowned artist, but behind his macabre and grotesque imagery lies a more brutal truth.

Alongside the insane Dr. Garrison and their mutant lackeys, he is kidnapping beautiful models and artists so he can take his art to the next stage, and turn living humans into living paintings. Jason, a young art student realizes this disgusting scheme a little bit too late, as his beloved girlfriend Janet has been kidnapped by Butler and Garrison. As he races to their mansion in the middle of nowhere, stoned and afraid, Butler's last words with the boy echoes in his mind; "Yesterday's nightmare is today's dream and tomorrow's reality."

References

External links

1969 films
1969 horror films
American independent films
Troma Entertainment films
Films directed by Joseph Adler
Films with screenplays by Larry Cohen
1960s English-language films
1960s American films